I briganti italiani (internationally released as The Italian Brigands and Seduction of the South) is a 1962 Italian comedy-drama film directed by Mario Camerini. It was shot in Cerreto Sannita.

Plot
During the Italian unification the revolutionist Santo Carbone abducts Colonel Breviglieri of the Piedmontese army.

Cast 
 Vittorio Gassman: 'O Caporale
 Ernest Borgnine: Sante Carbone
 Rosanna Schiaffino: Mariantonia
 Katy Jurado: Assunta Carbone
 Bernard Blier: Colonel Breviglieri
 Micheline Presle: La Marchesa
 Akim Tamiroff: 'O Zingaro
 Philippe Leroy: 'O Zelluso
 Mario Feliciani: Don Ramiro
 Carlo Taranto: 'O Scarrafone
 Carlo Pisacane: Filuccio
 Guido Celano: Muso
 Carlo Giuffrè: Lieutenant

References

External links
 
 

1962 films
Italian historical drama films
Films directed by Mario Camerini
1960s historical drama films
Films set in the 1860s
Films produced by Dino De Laurentiis
1960s Italian-language films
1960s Italian films